The Australian National Railways Commission was an agency of the Government of Australia that was a railway operator between 1975 and 1998. It traded as Australian National Railways (ANR) in its early years, before being rebranded as Australian National.  AN was widely used from 1980, the logotype being registered as a trade mark.

History

Australian National Railways was established by the Whitlam Federal Government following a commitment made in the 1972 election to invite the states to hand over their railway systems to the federal government. On 1 July 1975, Australian National Railways was formed taking over the operations of the federal government owned Commonwealth Railways.

The state governments of South Australia and Tasmania whose railway systems were deeply in debt, accepted. During the next two years, discussions between these two states and the federal government resulted in a number of staffing and operating agreements being made that resulted in all South Australian Railways services (except the Adelaide metropolitan passenger network) and all Tasmanian Government Railways services transferring to Australian National Railways in March 1978, the latter being rebranded AN Tasrail.

Overnight, Australian National Railways went from an organisation controlling just over 2,000 kilometres of track with a total staff of 4,000 employees to the operator of 20% of Australia's rail network. It now controlled 7,890 kilometres of rail track being 2,395 km of broad gauge, 2,812 km of standard gauge and 2,683 km of narrow gauge track. The narrow gauge track included 851 km in Tasmania and 748 km on South Australia's isolated Eyre Peninsula Railway. The remainder of the narrow gauge tracks were two short lines in the Mid North of South Australia radiating from Peterborough and Gladstone and the famous Ghan line from Marree to Alice Springs in the Northern Territory. The total number of employees numbered just over 12,000.

Australian National Railways was a federal government owned corporation and in 1978, the Fraser Government made it clear it was expected to achieve a financial break-even point during the next 10 years. This decision was unique in Australia's railway history because with the exception of Commonwealth Railways, all the state systems were running at a loss, being financially supported by their respective governments. The commission appointed a professional engineer with overseas experience as General Manager in a break from the traditional railway practice of making such appointments from within the organisations.

The commission's first corporate plan in 1979 set out six ways that the commission was to pursue if it was to survive. These were:
concentrating its marketing drive on bulk traffic, inter-capital freight and major city freight
seeking agreement to cease services where there is little or no demand for the services
rationalisation of services and withdrawal of services not effectively demanded
implement technological changes in all areas of railway operation particularly track maintenance
acquire larger and more efficient locomotives and rolling stock to operate trains at maximum capacity
pursue a vigorous policy directed towards staff reductions and more efficient use of manpower

In 1980, a delegation of senior staff and led by the General Manager visited North America to examine current railway practices. In Canada, the delegation had talks with Canadian National Railway (which like Australian National was government-owned) and Canadian Pacific Railway. In the United States, contact was made with Chessie System and Southern Pacific Railroad. The areas looked at included marketing and pricing, finance and planning, engineering and staff training.

On 12 March 1980, a new green and yellow corporate identity was launched with GM1 the first locomotive painted.

In October 1980, a new standard gauge line from Tarcoola to Alice Springs opened replacing the narrow gauge Central Australian Railway which closed in December 1980. In December 1982, the Adelaide to Crystal Brook line was converted to standard gauge.

Ownership of the Queanbeyan to Canberra railway line was transferred to the State Rail Authority in May 1985.

Locomotives
Australian National Railways inherited the following diesel locomotive classes:

Commonwealth Railways standard gauge: DE, GM, CL
Commonwealth Railways narrow gauge: NC, NSU, NT, NJ
South Australian Railways: 350, 500, 600, 700, 800, 830, 900, 930
Tasmanian Government Railways: X, Y, Z, Za

Built new for Australian National were the AL, BL, DL, EL and AN classes all for standard gauge use.

Also purchased were five T class locomotives from V/Line in 1993 that were reclassed as CKs.

In 1986, a new computer system required the class leaders of the former South Australian Railways to be renumbered as the last member of the class, e.g. 600 became 607.

Passenger services

Australian National operated passenger services within South Australia, mainly using Bluebird railcars. In December 1986, Australian National reintroduced services to Whyalla and Broken Hill using CB railcars. The remaining services were withdrawn in 1990. It also operated The Ghan. It also operated the Indian Pacific in partnership with the Public Transport Commission and Westrail and The Overland in partnership with the Victorian Railways. It took over the running of these services in full in February 1993 and 1994 respectively.

Australian National also operated the Trans Australian until June 1991 and The Alice between November 1983 and mid-1988.

Trailerail

Australian National entered a joint venture with National Rail to operate Roadrailers under the Trailerail brand. In November 1994, the first service commenced operating between Adelaide and Perth followed in November 1995 by a service from Adelaide to Melbourne. In 1996, Australian National withdrew from the joint venture with National Rail taking over its share.

Demise
Following the formation of National Rail, Australian National's interstate freight operations and rolling stock were transferred in 1994.

In November 1996, the Federal Government announced a major rail reform package that included the sale of Australian National.

On 1 November 1997, The Ghan, Indian Pacific and Overland passenger services were sold to Great Southern Rail, the South Australian intrastate services to Genesee & Wyoming Australia and AN Tasrail to the Australian Transport Network.

In July 1998, the railway infrastructure operated by Australian National's Track Access division, was transferred to the federal government owned Australian Rail Track Corporation.

In October 2000, following the resolution of outstanding issues relating to property and employee compensation, Australian National was wound up.

References

Further reading
 

Former government railways of Australia
Interstate rail in Australia
Trans-Australian Railway
1975 establishments in Australia
1998 disestablishments in Australia
Railway companies established in 1975
Railway companies disestablished in 1998
Defunct Commonwealth Government agencies of Australia